Irus or IRUS may refer to:

People
 Irus Braverman, legal scholar and ethnographer
 In Greek mythology, see Irus (mythology)
 Irus, a son of Actor and father of Eurytion and Eurydamas by Demonassa
 Irus or Arnaeus, a character in The Odyssey

Places
 Irus, Israel, a village in central Israel

Science and technology
 Irus (bivalve), a genus of clam in the family Veneridae
 13387 Irus, a minor planet